William Francisco Cobbs (born June 16, 1934) is an American actor. He is known for his roles in movies such as Louisiana Slim in The Hitter (1979),  Water in The Brother from Another Planet (1984), and as Lewis Coleman on I'll Fly Away (1991–1993), as Jack on The Michael Richards Show (2000), and guest appearances on Walker, Texas Ranger and The Sopranos. In 2020, he won a Daytime Emmy Award for Outstanding Limited Performance in a Daytime Program for the series Dino Dana.

Early life
Cobbs was born in Cleveland, Ohio, to a mother, Vera, who was a domestic worker and a father, David, who worked in construction. He is the second cousin of James Baskett.

Career
Cobbs served in the United States Air Force as a radar technician for eight years; he also worked in office products at IBM and sold cars in Cleveland. In 1970, at the age of 36, he left for New York to seek work as an actor. He supported himself by driving a cab, repairing office equipment, selling toys, and performing odd jobs.

Cobb credits Reuben Silver with his start in acting at the African American Performing Arts Center and Karamu House Theatre in Cleveland Ohio. His first professional acting role was in Ride a Black Horse at the Negro Ensemble Company. From there, he appeared in small theater productions, street theater, regional theater, and at the Eugene O'Neill Theatre.

As an amateur actor in the city's Karamu House Theater, Cobbs starred in the Ossie Davis play Purlie Victorious. Cobbs was in Vegetable Soup (1976), a New York public television educational series, and he made his feature film debut in The Taking of Pelham One Two Three in 1974. Cobbs has an extensive film career and has appeared and been a regular on many television programs, including The Michael Richards Show; The Outer Limits; I'll Fly Away; Yes, Dear; The Sopranos; Six Feet Under; The Others; JAG; The Drew Carey Show; October Road; One Tree Hill; Star Trek: Enterprise (as Dr. Emory Erickson, inventor of the Transporter); and many more. He had a recurring role as George, a blind grief-support-group member, in the TV series, Go On, which premiered in 2012.

In 2006, Cobbs played a supporting role in Night at the Museum as Reginald, a security guard on the verge of retirement. The character also served as an antagonist to the story. He played basketball coach and retired basketball player Arthur Chaney in Disney's Air Bud and Medgar Evers' older brother Charles Evers in Rob Reiner's Ghosts of Mississippi. He had a role in the Coen Brothers' The Hudsucker Proxy and played fictional jazz pianist Del Paxton in Tom Hanks' That Thing You Do. He has a brief appearance in the 2010 film The Search for Santa Paws.

In 2013, Cobbs co-starred in Oz the Great and Powerful  as the Master Tinker, and in late 2014 reprised his role of Reginald in Night at the Museum: Secret of the Tomb. He recorded a public service announcement for Deejay Ra's Hip-Hop Literacy2 campaign, encouraging reading of Ice-T's autobiography.

In 2020, he guest starred in the two-part series finale of Agents of S.H.I.E.L.D., portraying an unnamed elderly S.H.I.E.L.D. agent.

Filmography

References

External links

1934 births
African-American male actors
American male film actors
American male television actors
American male voice actors
Daytime Emmy Award winners
Living people
Male actors from Cleveland
21st-century African-American people
20th-century African-American people